Chelation therapy is a medical procedure that involves the administration of chelating agents to remove heavy metals from the body. Chelation therapy has a long history of use in clinical toxicology and remains in use for some very specific medical treatments, although it is administered under very careful medical supervision due to various inherent risks, including the mobilization of mercury and other metals through the brain and other parts of the body by the use of weak chelating agents that unbind with metals before elimination, exacerbating existing damage. To avoid mobilization, some practitioners of chelation use strong chelators, such as selenium, taken at low doses over a long period of time.

Chelation therapy must be administered with care as it has a number of possible side effects, including death. In response to increasing use of chelation therapy as alternative medicine and in circumstances in which the therapy should not be used in conventional medicine, various health organizations have confirmed that medical evidence does not support the effectiveness of chelation therapy for any purpose other than the treatment of heavy metal poisoning. Over-the-counter chelation products are not approved for sale in the United States.

Medical uses 
Chelation therapy is the preferred medical treatment for metal poisoning,  including acute mercury, iron (including in cases of sickle-cell disease and thalassemia), arsenic, lead, uranium, plutonium and other forms of toxic metal poisoning. The chelating agent may be administered intravenously, intramuscularly, or orally, depending on the agent and the type of poisoning.

Chelating agents

There are a variety of common chelating agents with differing affinities for different metals, physical characteristics, and biological mechanism of action. For the most common forms of heavy metal intoxication – lead, arsenic, or mercury – a number of chelating agents are available. Dimercaptosuccinic acid (DMSA) has been recommended for the treatment of lead poisoning in children by poison control centers around the world. Other chelating agents, such as 2,3-dimercaptopropanesulfonic acid (DMPS) and alpha lipoic acid (ALA), are used in conventional and alternative medicine. Some common chelating agents are ethylenediaminetetraacetic acid (EDTA), 2,3-dimercaptopropanesulfonic acid (DMPS), and thiamine tetrahydrofurfuryl disulfide (TTFD). Calcium-disodium EDTA and DMSA are only approved for the removal of lead by the Food and Drug Administration while DMPS and TTFD are not approved by the FDA. These drugs bind to heavy metals in the body and prevent them from binding to other agents. They are then excreted from the body. The chelating process also removes vital nutrients such as vitamins C and E, therefore these must be supplemented.

The German Environmental Agency (Umweltbundesamt) listed DMSA and DMPS as the two most useful and safe chelating agents available.

Side effects
When used properly in response to a diagnosis of harm from metal toxicity, side effects of chelation therapy include dehydration, low blood calcium, harm to kidneys, increased enzymes as would be detected in liver function tests, allergic reactions, and lowered levels of dietary elements. When administered inappropriately, there are the additional risks of hypocalcaemia (low calcium levels), neurodevelopmental disorders, and death.

History 

Chelation therapy can be traced back to the early 1930s, when Ferdinand Münz, a German chemist working for I.G. Farben, first synthesized ethylenediaminetetraacetic acid (EDTA). Munz was looking for a replacement for citric acid as a water softener. Chelation therapy itself began during World War II when chemists at the University of Oxford searched for an antidote for lewisite, an arsenic-based chemical weapon. The chemists learned that EDTA was particularly effective in treating lead poisoning.

Following World War II, chelation therapy was used to treat workers who had painted United States naval vessels with lead-based paints. In the 1950s, Norman Clarke, Sr. was treating workers at a battery factory for lead poisoning when he noticed that some of his patients had improved angina pectoris following chelation therapy. Clarke subsequently administered chelation therapy to patients with angina pectoris and other occlusive vascular disease and published his findings in The American Journal of the Medical Sciences in December 1956. He hypothesized that "EDTA could dissolve disease-causing plaques in the coronary systems of human beings." In a series of 283 patients treated by Clarke et al. From 1956 to 1960, 87% showed improvement in their symptomatology. Other early medical investigators made similar observations of EDTA's role in the treatment of cardiovascular disease (Bechtel, 1956; Bessman, 1957; Perry, 1961; Szekely, 1963; Wenig, 1958: and Wilder, 1962).

In 1973, a group of practicing physicians created the Academy of Medical Preventics (now the American College for Advancement in Medicine). The academy trains and certifies physicians in the safe administration of chelation therapy. Members of the academy continued to use EDTA therapy for the treatment of vascular disease and developed safer administration protocols.

In the 1960s, BAL was modified into DMSA, a related dithiol with far fewer side effects. DMSA quickly replaced both BAL and EDTA as the primary treatment for lead, arsenic and mercury poisoning in the United States. Esters of DMSA have been developed which are reportedly more effective; for example, the monoisoamyl ester (MiADMSA) is reportedly more effective than DMSA at clearing mercury and cadmium. Research in the former Soviet Union led to the introduction of DMPS, another dithiol, as a mercury-chelating agent. The Soviets also introduced ALA, which is transformed by the body into the dithiol dihydrolipoic acid, a mercury- and arsenic-chelating agent. DMPS has experimental status in the United States, while ALA is a common nutritional supplement.

Since the 1970s, iron chelation therapy has been used as an alternative to regular phlebotomy to treat excess iron stores in people with haemochromatosis. Other chelating agents have been discovered. They all function by making several chemical bonds with metal ions, thus rendering them much less chemically reactive. The resulting complex is water-soluble, allowing it to enter the bloodstream and be excreted harmlessly.

Calcium-disodium EDTA chelation has been studied by the U.S. National Center for Complementary and Alternative Medicine for treating coronary disease. In 1998, the U.S. Federal Trade Commission (FTC) pursued the American College for Advancement in Medicine (ACAM), an organization that promotes "complementary, alternative and integrative medicine" over the claims made regarding the treatment of atherosclerosis in advertisements for EDTA chelation therapy. The FTC concluded that there was a lack of scientific studies to support these claims and that the statements by the ACAM were false. In 1999, the ACAM agreed to stop presenting chelation therapy as effective in treating heart disease, avoiding legal proceedings. In 2010 the U.S. Food and Drug Administration (FDA) warned companies who sold over-the-counter (OTC) chelation products and stated that such "products are unapproved drugs and devices and that it is a violation of federal law to make unproven claims about these products. There are no FDA-approved OTC chelation products."

Society and culture
In 1998, the U.S. Federal Trade Commission (FTC) charged that the web site of the American College for Advancement in Medicine (ACAM) and a brochure they published had made false or unsubstantiated claims. In December 1998, the FTC announced that it had secured a consent agreement barring ACAM from making unsubstantiated advertising claims that chelation therapy is effective against atherosclerosis or any other disease of the circulatory system.

In August 2005, doctor error led to the death of a five-year-old boy with autism who was undergoing chelation therapy. Others, including a three-year-old nonautistic girl and a nonautistic adult, have died while undergoing chelation therapy. These deaths were due to cardiac arrest caused by hypocalcemia during chelation therapy. In two of the cases hypocalcemia appears to have been caused by the administration of Na2EDTA (disodium EDTA) and in the third case the type of EDTA was unknown. Only the 3-year-old girl had found to have an elevated blood lead level and resulting low iron levels and anemia, which is the conventional medical cause for administration of chelation therapy. According to protocol, EDTA should not be used in the treatment of children. More than 30 deaths have been recorded in association with IV-administered disodium EDTA since the 1970s.

Use in alternative medicine
In alternative medicine, some practitioners claim chelation therapy can treat a variety of ailments, including heart disease and autism. The use of chelation therapy by alternative medicine practitioners for behavioral and other disorders is considered pseudoscientific; there is no proof that it is effective. Chelation therapy prior to heavy metal testing can artificially raise urinary heavy metal concentrations ("provoked" urine testing) and lead to inappropriate and unnecessary treatment. The American College of Medical Toxicology and the American Academy of Clinical Toxicology warn the public that chelating drugs used in chelation therapy may have serious side effects, including liver and kidney damage, blood pressure changes, allergies and in some cases even death of the patient.

Cancer
The American Cancer Society says of chelation therapy: "Available scientific evidence does not support claims that it is effective for treating other conditions such as cancer. Chelation therapy can be toxic and has the potential to cause kidney damage, irregular heartbeat, and even death."

Cardiovascular disease
According to the findings of a 1997 systematic review, EDTA chelation therapy is not effective as a treatment for coronary artery disease and this use is not approved in the United States by the US Food and Drug Administration (FDA).

The American Heart Association stated in 1997 that there is "no scientific evidence to demonstrate any benefit from this form of therapy." The United States Food and Drug Administration (FDA), the National Institutes of Health (NIH) and the American College of Cardiology "all agree with the American Heart Association" that "there have been no adequate, controlled, published scientific studies using currently approved scientific methodology to support this therapy for cardiovascular disease." They speculate that any improvement among heart patients undergoing chelation therapy can be attributed to the placebo effect and generally recommended lifestyle changes such as "quitting smoking, losing weight, eating more fruits and vegetables, avoiding foods high in saturated fats and exercising regularly." They also are concerned that patients could put off proven treatments for heart disease like drugs or surgery.

A systematic review published in 2005 found that controlled scientific studies did not support chelation therapy for heart disease. It found that very small trials and uncontrolled descriptive studies have reported benefits while larger controlled studies have found results no better than placebo.

In 2009, the Montana Board of Medical Examiners issued a position paper concluding that "chelation therapy has no proven efficacy in the treatment of cardiovascular disease, and in some patients could be injurious."

The U.S. National Center for Complementary and Alternative Medicine (NCCAM) conducted a trial on the chelation therapy's safety and efficacy for patients with coronary artery disease. NCCAM Director Stephen E. Straus cited the "widespread use of chelation therapy in lieu of established therapies, the lack of adequate prior research to verify its safety and effectiveness, and the overall impact of coronary artery disease" as factors motivating the trial. The study has been criticized by some who said it was unethical, unnecessary and dangerous, and that multiple studies conducted prior to it demonstrated that the treatment provides no benefit.

The US National Center for Complementary and Alternative Medicine began the Trial to Assess Chelation Therapy (TACT) in 2003. Patient enrollment was to be completed around July 2009 with final completion around July 2010, but enrollment in the trial was voluntarily suspended by organizers in September 2008 after the Office for Human Research Protections began investigating complaints such as inadequate informed consent. Additionally, the trial was criticized for lacking prior Phase I and II studies, and critics summarized previous controlled trials as having "found no evidence that chelation is superior to placebo for treatment of CAD or PVD." The same critics argued that methodological flaws and lack of prior probability made the trial "unethical, dangerous, pointless, and wasteful." The American College of Cardiology supported the trial and research to explore whether chelation therapy was effective in treating heart disease. Evidence of insurance fraud and other felony convictions among (chelation proponent) investigators further undermined the credibility of the trial.

The final results of TACT were published in November 2012. The authors concluded that disodium EDTA chelation "modestly" reduced the risk of adverse cardiovascular outcomes among stable patients with a history of myocardial infarction. The study also showed a "marked" reduction in cardiovascular events in diabetic patients treated with EDTA chelation. An editorial published in the Journal of the American Medical Association said that "the study findings may provide novel hypotheses that merit further evaluation to help understand the pathophysiology of secondary prevention of vascular disease." Critics of the study characterized the study as showing no support for the use of chelation therapy in coronary heart disease, particularly the claims to reduce the need for coronary artery bypass grafting (CABG, pronounced "cabbage").

Autism 

Quackwatch says that autism is one of the conditions for which chelation therapy has been falsely promoted as effective, and practitioners falsify diagnoses of metal poisoning to trick parents into having their children undergo the risky process. , up to 7% of children with autism worldwide had been subjected to chelation therapy.  The death of two children in 2005 was caused by the administration of chelation treatments, according to the American Center for Disease Control. One of them had autism. Parents either have a doctor use a treatment for lead poisoning, or buy unregulated supplements, in particular DMSA and lipoic acid. Aspies For Freedom, an autism rights organization, considers this use of chelation therapy unethical and potentially dangerous.  There is little to no credible scientific research that supports the use of chelation therapy for the effective treatment of autism.

See also 
 List of ineffective cancer treatments
 Detoxification

References

External links 
 Chelation Therapy: Unproven Claims and Unsound Theories - Quackwatch

Detoxification
Alternative therapies for developmental and learning disabilities
Alternative detoxification
Alternative medical treatments
Autism pseudoscience